The second-generation Chevrolet Camaro is an American pony car that was produced by Chevrolet from 1970 through the 1981 model years. It was introduced in the spring of 1970. Build information for model 123-12487 was released to the assembly plants in February of that same year. It was longer, lower, and wider than the first generation Camaro. A convertible, which was available for the first generation, was unavailable for the second. GM engineers have said the second generation is much more of "A Driver's Car" than its predecessor.

History

Overview 
Dubbed "Super Hugger", the second-generation Camaro was an all-new car with its basic mechanical layout familiar and engineered much like its predecessor with a unibody structure utilizing a front subframe, A-arm and coil spring front suspension, and rear leaf springs.

The chassis and suspension of the second generation were refined in both performance and comfort; base models offered significant advances in sound-proofing, ride isolation, and road-holding. Extensive experience Chevrolet engineers had gained racing the first-generation led directly to advances in second-generation Camaro steering, braking, and balance. High-performance configurations were initially available, but the marketplace changed as 1970s progressed with fuel crisis, higher insurance rates, and tightening emissions regulations. Major styling changes were made in 1974 and 1978; 1981 was the final model year for the second-generation Camaro.

Models and changes 1970–1981

1970 

Two  engines (the LS6 and LS7) were listed on early specification sheets and in some sales brochures but never made it into production. Besides the base model, buyers could select the Rally Sport option with a distinctive nose and bumper, a Super Sport package, and the Z-28 Special Performance Package (priced at US$572.95) featuring a new high-performance LT-1   of torque  V8. The LT-1, an engine built from the ground up using premium parts and components, was a much better performer overall than the previous  V8s used in 1967-69 Z-28s; greater torque and less-radical cam, coupled with the 780 cfm Holley four-barrel, permitted the Z-28 to be available with the 3-speed Turbo Hydramatic 400 automatic transmission as an option to the four-speed manual for the first time. The LT-1 engine in the 1970 Camaro Z-28 came from the Corvette.

The new body style featured a fastback roofline and ventless full-door glass with no rear side quarter windows. Doors were wider to permit easier access to the rear seat, and new pull-up handles replaced the old handles, for which the lower button had to be pushed in to open the door. The roof was a new double-shell unit for improved rollover protection and noise reduction. The base model featured a separate bumper/grille design with parking lights under the bumper, while the Rally Sport option included a distinctive grille surrounded by a flexible Endura material along with round parking lights beside the headlights and bumperettes surrounding on both sides of the grille. The rear was highlighted by four round taillights similar to the Corvette. A convertible was not offered, making this the only Camaro generation not to offer one.

The 1970 was the first Camaro offered with a rear stabilizer bar. The four-wheel disc brake option (RPO JL8 of 1969) was dropped.

Inside, a new curved instrument panel featured several round dials for gauges and other switches directly in front of the driver while the lower section included the heating/air conditioning controls to the driver's left and radio, cigarette lighter and ashtray in the center and glovebox door on the right. New Strato bucket seats, unique to 1970 models, featured squared-off seatbacks and adjustable headrests, and the rear seating consisted of two bucket cushions and a bench seat back due to the higher transmission tunnel. The optional center console, with standard Hurst shifter, was now integrated into the lower dashboard with small storage area or optional stereo tape player. The standard interior featured all-vinyl upholstery and a matte black dashboard finish, while an optional custom interior came with upgraded cloth or vinyl upholstery and woodgrain trim on dash and console.

The 1970 model was introduced to the assembly plants in February 1970, halfway through the model year. This caused some people to refer to it as a "1970½." model; all were 1970 models. The 1970 model year vehicles are generally regarded as the most desirable of the early second-generation Camaros, since the performance of following years was reduced by the automobile emissions control systems of the period and later the addition of heavy federally mandated bumpers.

1971 

The 1971 Camaro received only minor appearance changes from its 1970 counterpart. Inside, new high-back Strato bucket seats with built-in headrests replaced the 1970-only low-back seats with adjustable headrests. The biggest changes came under the hood, due to a GM-corporate mandate that all engines be designed to run on lower-octane regular-leaded, low-lead, or unleaded gasoline, necessitating reductions in compression ratios and horsepower ratings. The  straight-6,  V8, and two-barrel  V8 were virtually unchanged, as they were low-compression regular-fuel engines in 1970 and previous years.

The LT-1 350 V8 used in the Z/28 dropped from 360 hp SAE gross to  SAE gross due to a compression ratio decrease from 11.0:1 to 10.3:1. The 350 c.i. engine in the 1971 Camaro Z28 produced  SAE net. The 396 (402 c.i.) V8 dropped from 350 to  SAE gross due to compression ratio drop from 10.25:1 to 8.5:1. The 402 c.i. engine in the 1971 Camaro SS 396 produced  SAE net.

Production and sales dropped due to a 67-day corporate-wide strike at GM that coincided with the introduction of the 1971 models in late September 1970, along with a continued declining interest in the ponycar market fueled by skyrocketing insurance rates for high-performance cars. Rumors of the possible cancellation of the Camaro after 1972 began to surface and were nearly confirmed a year later when another worker's strike hit the assembly plant at Norwood, Ohio, which was the only plant building Camaros and Firebirds.

1972 

The 1972 Camaro suffered two major setbacks. The UAW strike at a GM assembly plant in Norwood disrupted production for 174 days, and 1,100 incomplete Camaros had to be scrapped because they could not meet 1973 federal bumper safety standards. Some at GM seriously considered dropping the Camaro and Firebird altogether, particularly while the corporation was under pressure to adapt its vast number of makes and models to difficult new regulations for emissions, safety, and fuel economy. Others pointed out the fiercely loyal followings the cars enjoyed and were convinced the models remained viable. The latter group eventually convinced those in favor of dropping the F-cars to reconsider, and Chevrolet would go on to produce 68,656 Camaros in 1972. Only 970 SS 396s were produced in 1972, and this was the last year for the SS 396 and SS 350 models, as well as the last year the Camaro was offered with a Big Block from the factory. This year the badges changed from "Z/28" to "Z28". Horsepower ratings continued to drop, not only due to lower compression and tighter emissions controls but, beginning with the 1972 model year, a switch from gross (on dynamometer) to net ratings based on an engine in an actual vehicle with all accessories installed. With that, the 350 ci LT1 dropped from 330 gross horsepower in 1971 to 255 net horsepower for 1972 and the big-block 396/402 was now rated at 240 net horsepower compared to 300 gross horses in 1971.

1973 

The 1973 model year incorporated standard impact-absorbing front bumper system to meet new no-damage standards in  NHTSA legislation. The Rally Sport option, with its chrome bumperettes on either side of an impact absorbing urethane grill surround, continued for one more year due to creative bracing behind the front sheetmetal.

A new Type LT model was offered in 1973, with a quieter and better-appointed interior, full instrumentation, Rally-style wheels, variable-ratio steering, sport mirrors, and hidden windshield wipers, among other upgrades. The Super Sport package was dropped, and the big block  V8 was no longer available. Power was down due to new emissions standards, with the top-rated  V8 producing  in the Z28. The engine was switched from solid-lifters to hydraulic tappets. Air conditioning became available as an option with this engine. The Z28 option could be ordered on both the sport coupe and LT models. When the Z28 and Type LT options were combined, the usual Z28 badges, stripes, and graphics were deleted.

Other changes included a new console-mounted shifter for automatic transmissions similar to the shifter used in Pontiac Firebirds replacing the Buick-like horseshoe shifter of previous Camaros, and the reintroduction of power windows to the option list for the first time since 1969, with the switches mounted in the console.

Recovering from the strike, Camaro sales increased to 96,751 units during a record sales year industry-wide.

1974 

The 1974 Camaro grew seven inches (178 mm) longer, thanks to new aluminum bumpers required to meet federal standards and a forward-sloping grille. Round taillights were replaced with a rectangular wraparound design. It was the last year to have a flat rear window, with thick roof pillars. All later years had slimmer roof pillars and a wraparound rear window for better visibility. This was the last year of the RPO Z28, which shared the same drive train and engine as in the previous year (1973), based on the Corvette L82 special high-performance engine (the Z28 would re-emerge in 1977 as its own model and no longer a RPO).

Camaro sales increased to over 150,000 units, of which 13,802 were Z28s (the highest 2nd-generation Z28 production to this time) despite the energy crisis fueled by the Arab Oil Embargo. Two ponycar competitors were repositioned in the marketplace this year. Ford downsized the Mustang to an all new 1974 Ford Mustang II subcompact based on the Pinto that was designed for an era of high gas prices and fuel shortages resulting in 385,993 units produced for the model year. Mercury upsized the Cougar to an intermediate-sized personal luxury car to compete with the Chevrolet Monte Carlo and Pontiac Grand Prix. Other changes included Chrysler Corporation discontinuing the Plymouth Barracuda and Dodge Challenger during the course of the 1974 model year. Likewise, 1974 was the final year of the AMC Javelin, but a sporty AMX model would be reintroduced in 1978.

1975 

For 1975, a catalytic converter was added to the exhaust system of all US-market GM passenger cars, including the Camaro. The "Air Injection Reactor" secondary air injection system was still present. The catalytic emission control system was more efficient at reducing emissions than the previous non-catalytic system, and allowed engines to be retuned for improved drivability and fuel economy.

The Z28 option was discontinued for 1975 despite an increase in sales to over 13,000 units in 1974. Optional engines continued to reflect the impact of emissions. Two 350 cid (5.7 L) V8s produced  145 hp (108 kW) and 155 hp (116 kW) (Horsepower losses can seem a bit exaggerated compared to earlier cars, however, their power ratings were now net as opposed to the prior gross ratings. SAE net power ratings (used since 1972) were taken from the engine crankshaft as before, but now all accessories had to be attached and operating, and all emissions equipment and a full production exhaust system had to be in place. These power-robbing additions — along with stringent new emissions laws and the equipment they required — were instrumental in creating the vastly smaller power figures found in subsequent cars. The manufacturers themselves also sometimes intentionally underrated engines for a variety of motives, notably avoiding provoking the insurance companies and federal regulators into enacting undesirable policies, but also sometimes to prevent lower priced models from stacking up too well on paper against their own more profitable high-end products.

A new wraparound rear window was introduced for 1975 and the Camaro emblem moved from the center of the grille to above the grillework and the "Camaro" nameplate was deleted from the rear decklid. Also new block letter "Camaro" nameplates replaced the previous scripts on the front fenders. Interiors were revised slightly with new seat trim patterns and bird's-eye maple trim replacing the Meridian grained walnut on the instrument panel of LT models. Announced for this year was the availability of a leather interior option in the Camaro LT, but never saw the light of day as no production cars were equipped with real hide seats. Other developments included the availability of air conditioning with six-cylinder engines and standard radial tires on all models. Power door locks were a new option for 1975. The Rally Sport option returned after a one-year absence, but amounted to little more than an appearance package.

Despite the loss of the Z28, Camaro sales remained steady for 1975 at 145,770 units. With the demise of the other pony cars the previous year, Camaro and Pontiac's Firebird were now the only traditional pony cars left on the market, giving GM 100 percent penetration of this segment for the first time ever. Also, despite General Motors' policy against factory-sponsored racing efforts, Camaro began to make a name for itself on the track on the new International Race of Champions (IROC) series with many top drivers winning trophies from behind the wheel of a Camaro year after year until the late 1980s.

1976 

Only minor appearance changes highlighted the 1976 Camaro, most notably a brushed metal insert in the rear tail section on the LT model. The 250 cubic-inch six-cylinder remained the standard engine in the sport coupe and a new  305 cubic-inch V8 became the standard engine in the LT and base V8 option in the sport coupe. Power brakes became standard on V8 models this year. The Camaro's popularity was soaring. Sales totals jumped significantly for 1976, the best year yet for the second generation, and were to improve even more dramatically as the decade progressed.

1977 

The Z28 was reintroduced, as a model and not an RPO, to the buying public in the spring of 1977 as a 1977½ in response to increasing sales of Pontiac's Trans Am, which sold over 46,000 units in 1976 and accounted for half of all Firebird sales that year.The revived Z28 was powered by a  V8 with four-barrel carburetor producing  ( with California emissions equipment), with most cars sold equipped with air conditioning and an automatic transmission. The engine no longer came with the 4-bolt main bearing engine block, forged crank, forged pistons, big valve heads, and performance camshaft that had been part of the RPO Z28 Special Performance Package, the engine that had been shared with the Corvette LT-1 and L82 top-performance 350 engines from 1970 to 1974. The LM1 engine was the most powerful Camaro engine and only available in the Z28 model. The engine came with better tuned intake and exhaust, shared with most all Chevy passenger cars. The cars were also available with a Borg-Warner Super T-10 4-speed manual transmission.

Intermittent wipers were offered as a new option and the  I-6 became the standard engine for both the sport coupe and luxury LT models. Due to General Motors' engine sharing program, the 350 CID Chevrolet engine was also used by Oldsmobile. This year the optional "Bumperettes" were offered for the LT models (front bumper only) and were mandatory for all Camaro models sold in the state of California.

Output set a record for the second-generation Camaro, with 218,853 coupes produced. The Camaro outsold Ford's Mustang for the first time ever. For 1977 Z28 production was around 13,000 cars with a  350 engine.

1978 

For the 1978 model year, the Camaro featured a new body colored urethane front and rear bumpers. Z28s featured a non-functioning hood scoop with outlining decal around the intake. The taillights were updated to include amber turn signals. Sales topped all previous years with 272,631 units, of which 54,907 were the Z28 model.

Available models included the base Sport Coupe, Type LT, Z28, and the return of the Rally Sport. The Rally Sport (not badged RS as in previous years) featured a standard two-tone paint treatment.

Another first for 1978 was T-Tops, although they were a regular production option on the 1977 Pontiac Firebird and were introduced on the 1976 Pontiac Trans Am 10th Anniversary Limited Edition.

1979 

The biggest changes for 1979 were the introduction of the luxury-oriented Berlinetta model, replacing the Type LT, and a restyled instrument panel with a much flatter appearance than the previous wraparound design (although the gauges themselves remained in the same places as before). The base models, RS and Z28 remained, the Z28s now came with a front spoiler and fender flares much like its Pontiac Trans Am twin had, and now came with "Z28" decals that ran from the beginning of the front flares to the bottoms of the doors. Electric rear window defroster became optional this year, replacing the old blower type. Sales for 1979 were the highest ever for any generation Camaro before or since, numbering 282,571 units. Engine choices remained with the 250 I6 standard in the base and RS models, with the 305 2bbl being an option and standard on the Berlinetta.

1980 

For 1980 the aged  inline-six was replaced with a  V6 engine,  in California, a first for Camaro. The  (4.4 L) 267 cu in V8 engine became an option on the base, RS and Berlinetta models this year. The Z28 hood included a rear-pointing raised scoop (air induction) with a solenoid operated flap which opened at full throttle, allowing the engine to breathe cooler air. A federally mandated  speedometer also debuted this year, down from 130. Z28s had new optional grey 5-spoke rims (later used on the 1986–1988 Chevrolet Monte Carlo SS), a unique upper and lower front grill and smaller revised graphics on its doors. The side scoops were also changed from a louvered design to a flatter one with a single opening. The  V8 was now only available on the Z28 this year.

1981 

The 1981 model was nearly unchanged from 1980 and would be the last model year for the second-generation Camaro. The Z28 was still powered by a  V8, however due to new emissions regulations the engine was now equipped with a CCC (Computer Command Control) unit for the first time. This predecessor to modern engine control modules had an oxygen sensor, an electronically controlled carburetor, a throttle position sensor, coolant sensors, a barometric pressure sensor, a Manifold Absolute Pressure sensor (MAP), and a check engine light on the dash. The transmission was now equipped with a lockup torque converter, controlled by the CCC as well. The CCC could also be used as a self-diagnostic tool. Canadian models, however, could still get the 350 and 4-speed combination, and were not equipped with a CCC. Canadian 1981 Camaros were thus identical to 1980 US model. RS models were dropped this year, but the RS designation would reappear in 1989. Total production had dropped down to 126,139 from a high of 282,571 in 1979.

References

External links 

 
 Chevrolet Camaro (2nd Generation)

Camaro 2
Chevrolet Camaro 2
Chevrolet Camaro 2
Chevrolet Camaro 2
Chevrolet Camaro 2
Cars introduced in 1970
Cars discontinued in 1981